Stephen Jack Marriott (born 8 November 1886; died 25 December 1964) was an Anglican priest, most notably Archdeacon of Westminster from 1946 to 1951.

Donaldson was educated at Christ's College, Cambridge and ordained in 1913. He served curacies in Southport, Rye Park and Folkestone. He was a temporary Naval Chaplain and RAF from 1917 to 1918. He served incumbencies at South Queensferry and North Berwick. In 1937 he became a Canon of Westminster.

References

20th-century English Anglican priests
1886 births
Alumni of Christ's College, Cambridge
1964 deaths
Archdeacons of Westminster